Gong Yi (龔一, b. 1941) is a guqin master from Shanghai, presently one of the instrument's leading figures. Born in Nanjing, he trained first under several local players (including Liu Shaochun and Xia Yifeng) before proceeding to the Shanghai Conservatory where he absorbed a range of styles from such prominent masters as Zhang Ziqian, Xu Lisun, Gu Meigeng, and Wei Zhongle. Gong Yi has had, since the 1950s, a varied career performing, teaching, composing, and researching under the auspices of several institutions and ensembles, most notably the Shanghai Chinese Orchestra of which he was director and sole guqin player. In guqin circles he is particularly noted for his efforts toward integration of the instrument into the conservatory mainstream.

External links
Treasures Of Chinese Instrumental Music, Guqin
Treasures Of Chinese Instrumental Music

References

Living people
Guqin players
People's Republic of China musicians
Musicians from Shanghai
1941 births